earthTV Network GmbH is a German satellite television network, which airs live broadcasts from its camera network around the world. Cameras are located in well-known cities as well as lesser known locations. EarthTV cameras usually feature beaches, mountains, seaside resorts, or skylines of major cities. They now have over 70 cameras and air the so-called World Live program, featuring 7 locations in 90 seconds, which is shown in 200 countries, reaching more than 2 billion viewers daily.

The cameras for live streaming are fully remote controlled from the broadcast centre in Munich. The programme featuring cities and landscapes is transmitted from the headquarters in Munich and from there they are sent to worldwide partners under the name World Live and similar formats such as Prayer Times and The Weather Today, claiming to reach 2 billion viewers in 200 countries, available in 10 languages and broadcast across 40 TV stations.

Earth television network GmbH (earthTV), a company of Telecast Media Group (founded in 1985), produces, processes, manages and distributes broadcast quality video content from destinations around the world for use on the internet, mobile phones, info-screens and television.

At the beginning of the millennium earthTV started to set up a network of fully remote-controlled TV cameras with motion control heads and zoom lenses, delivering live video feeds in broadcast quality, day and night, since earthTV cameras work well in low-light conditions. The unique technology and hardware of earthTV equipment is the exclusive property of earthTV protected by several international patents.

History
In 2009, the BBC selected earthTV.com as one of the best websites: "The quality of the earthTV feeds is exceptional". In the same year, earthTV launched its video-player, which features on a growing number of mainly weather and news-related websites.

Programmes

 The World Live
 Motion Timelapse
 Seasonal Motion Timelapse
 Earthquiz
 World Weather
 Best of the Month
 Best of World Live
 El Mundo en Directo (Spanish)
 The World Programmes
 What a World!
 What a Day!
 What a Month!
 World Cup Countdown
 World Cultural Events

The programmes are aired on a multitude of news, travel and geographic channels throughout the globe, including Bloomberg TV, N24, Wetter.com TV, France 2, Jurnal TV, Power TV, ON E, Al Arabiya, Al Iraqiya, Al Sharqiya, Saudi Broadcasting Corporation, Oman TV, Kurdsat, TVB Jade and SBS.

Music
The music from earthTV is on the CD earthgrooves. Volume 1 and 2 are available via iTunes.

References

External links
 

Television stations in Germany
Television in Germany
Mass media in Berlin
Mass media companies established in 1985
1985 establishments in West Germany
Television channels and stations established in 1998
1998 establishments in Germany